Chronicles from the Land of the Happiest People on Earth is a 2021 novel by Nigerian writer Wole Soyinka. It is his third novel, and his first since Season of Anomy in 1973.

Plot
The novel takes place in an imaginary version of Nigeria. A secret society made up of highly-placed members of the nation's political and religious elite trades in human body parts for use in religious rituals. The body parts are stolen from a hospital run by Dr. Menka, whose friend Duyole is about to begin a prestigious job at the United Nations in New York City. Duyole is targeted by mysterious forces who try to prevent him from taking the new position. The story is intended as an allegory of the state-sponsored corruption that is common in Nigeria and similar African nations.

Reception
The novel received generally favorable reviews from critics. Ben Okri, a Nigerian writer who contributed a review for The Guardian, called the book "a vast danse macabre" and "Soyinka’s greatest novel, his revenge against the insanities of the nation’s ruling class and one of the most shocking chronicles of an African nation in the 21st century." The New York Times  noted that Soyinka wrote the novel as "lament for the spirit of his native Nigeria," and while the plot is "convoluted, obscure at times, [and] often tying itself in too many knots," the novel is ultimately a successful exploration of "the crossroads between corruption, religious fanaticism, endemic resentments and a legacy of colonial divisiveness." 

NPR was somewhat less positive, concluding that the novel is not among Soyinka's best works, but "[t]he parts of the novel that are good are immensely good – and in true Soyinka fashion, the writing tosses you right into the middle of Nigerian life, for better or worse."

References

2021 Nigerian novels
Novels by Wole Soyinka